Hermann Gramlich (24 April 1913 – 6 February 1942) was a German international footballer.

Personal life
An Obergefreiter (corporal) in the German army, Gramlich died on 6 February 1942 in Bardino, Yukhnovsky District of the Russian Soviet Federative Socialist Republic during World War II at the age of 28.

References

1913 births
1942 deaths
People from Villingen-Schwenningen
Sportspeople from Freiburg (region)
Footballers from Baden-Württemberg
Association football defenders
German footballers
Germany international footballers
German Army personnel killed in World War II
German Army soldiers of World War II
Military personnel from Baden-Württemberg